Benioff is a surname. Notable people with the surname include:

David Benioff (born 1970), American writer, screenwriter and television producer
Hugo Benioff (1899–1968), American seismologist and academic
Wadati–Benioff zone
Marc Benioff (born 1964), American businessman, founder of Salesforce
Paul Benioff (born 1930), physicist, quantum computing pioneer